is a case of the Supreme Court of Canada on the applicability of arbitration laws on the authority of a receiver appointed under the Bankruptcy and Insolvency Act.

Background

Petrowest Corporation, together with Acciona and Samsung, formed Peace River Hydro Partners in 2015 as a partnership to perform work for BC Hydro on its Site C project site in northeastern British Columbia. At the time, Petrowest was reported to be experiencing difficulties in meeting its debt covenants. In 2017, Petrowest was ousted from the partnership, and its lenders subsequently obtained permission from the Court of Queen's Bench of Alberta to place it and all its affiliates into receivership. Ernst & Young was appointed as Receiver, and it also became the trustee in bankruptcy of the affiliates in 2018.

The Receiver sued PRHP in the Supreme Court of British Columbia for amounts allegedly owed under the partnership agreement (together with connected purchase orders and subcontracting agreement), as well as pursuing Acciona and Samsung for amounts said to be owed under related guarantee and cross-indemnity agreements. The defendants argued that the agreements contained clauses that required disputes to be submitted to arbitration, while the plaintiffs stated that, as a court-appointed officer, the Receiver was not bound by the debtor's contracts, and could seek the direction of the court in order to achieve the objectives of the Bankruptcy and Insolvency Act.

The courts below
At the BC Supreme Court, Iyer J held that the province's Arbitration Act was engaged in the current case, but current insolvency jurisprudence stated that the Bankruptcy and Insolvency Act allowed the court to exercise its "inherent jurisdiction to control its own processes in order to promote the objectives of the BIA". Accordingly, the BC Act does not prevent a court from exercising its discretion, such discretion was appropriate in this case, and the defendants' application to stay proceedings was therefore refused.

At the British Columbia Court of Appeal, the appeal was dismissed for different reasons than were given in the Supreme Court. In a unanimous ruling, Grauer JA held:

 as was recently discussed in Uber Technologies Inc v Heller, the doctrine of separability holds that arbitration clauses constitute agreements separate from their underlying contracts.
 the Receiver is a court-appointed officer, and by acting in that capacity "the receiver acts not as agent of the debtor (Petrowest), who has been legally paralyzed from acting, but rather acts in fulfilment of its own court-authorized and fiduciary duties, owed to all stakeholders.  Petrowest, on the other hand, can do nothing."
 the Receiver had disclaimed the arbitration clauses, they became "void, inoperative or incapable of being performed", and therefore the Arbitration Act was therefore not engaged.
 it was unnecessary to consider the question of inherent jurisdiction in the matter.

In June 2021, the Supreme Court of Canada granted leave to appeal.

At the Supreme Court of Canada

The appeal was dismissed, with costs throughout. The BC Court of Appeal erred in holding that the Receiver was not a party to the arbitration agreements. However, the judge at first instance was entitled to refuse to grant a stay, and in the circumstances she correctly dismissed the stay application.

Majority
Côté J noted that the result was "context‑specific", as "arbitration law and insolvency law ... have much in common, including an emphasis on efficiency and expediency, procedural flexibility, and expert decision‑making." While arbitration is generally to be favoured, insolvency law may require it to be displaced to ensure a more timely resolution. She gave guidance as to which course is preferable in given circumstances.

Stays of proceedings in favour of arbitration are preferred where:
 an arbitration agreement exists;
 court proceedings have been commenced by a party to the arbitration agreement
 the court proceedings are in respect of a matter that the parties agreed to submit to arbitration; and
  the party applying for a stay in favour of arbitration does so before taking any “step” in the court proceedings.

A stay may be refused where an arbitration agreement is "void, inoperative or incapable of being performed":
 "void" encompasses agreements obtained by "undermined by fraud, undue influence, unconscionability, duress, mistake, or misrepresentation"
 "inoperative" circumstances "include frustration, discharge by breach, waiver, or a subsequent agreement between the parties"
 an agreement is "incapable of being performed" where there is "a physical or legal impediment beyond the parties’ control"

The BIA gives a court jurisdiction to find an agreement "inoperative", having regard to the following factors:

The effect of arbitration on the integrity of the insolvency proceedings
The relative prejudice to the parties from the referral of the dispute to arbitration
The urgency of resolving the dispute
The applicability of a stay of proceedings under bankruptcy or insolvency law
Any other factor the court considers material in the circumstances

Applying these tests to the case at hand, a mandatory stay of proceedings was available under the Arbitration Act, as the Receiver was a party to the agreements, but enforcing them "would compromise the orderly and efficient resolution of the receivership, contrary to the purposes of the BIA." Accordingly, they were inoperative under the Act.

Concurrence
While agreeing with the majority as to the outcome, Jamal J argued that the Receiver was operating under the terms granted by the underlying receivership order (which gave the Receiver the choice of pursuing either arbitration or court proceedings), and the arbitration agreements were accordingly disclaimed by his choosing to sue in court for the disputed amounts. If his action is challenged, it is up to the court to determine whether he was acting within the scope of the order.

Impact and aftermath
The test outlined by Côté J is relevant to suits or proceedings brought by a debtor, as those against a debtor are normally stayed in insolvency cases. In view of the SCC's preference for "efficiency and expediency, procedural flexibility, and expert decision‑making", legal observers suggest that arbitration agreements be as simple, efficient and cost-effective as possible, in order to survive after a party goes into bankruptcy or insolvency.

Further reading

External links

Notes and references

Notes

References

Supreme Court of Canada cases
Arbitration cases
Canadian contract case law
Canadian insolvency case law
2022 in Canadian case law